An Ji-min (born 29 April 1992) is a South Korean speed skater. She competed in the women's 500 metres at the 2010 Winter Olympics.

References

1992 births
Living people
South Korean female speed skaters
Olympic speed skaters of South Korea
Speed skaters at the 2010 Winter Olympics
Speed skaters from Seoul
Universiade bronze medalists for South Korea
Universiade medalists in speed skating
Competitors at the 2013 Winter Universiade
21st-century South Korean women